Lycoseris is a genus of Central and South American flowering plants in the family Asteraceae.

 Species

References

 
Asteraceae genera
Flora of South America
Taxonomy articles created by Polbot